Tripura Upajati Juba Samiti ("Tripura Tribal Youth Association") was a political party in the Indian state of Tripura from 1977–2001. During 1988-93, the Indian National Congress formed a coalition government with the TUJS at the Tripura Legislative Assembly.

In 2001, TUJS dissolved and split to form  Indigenous Nationalist Party of Twipra & Indigenous People's Front of Tripura.

Electoral Performance
The INC-TUJS coalition together won 32 seats out of 60 at the 1988 Tripura Legislative Assembly election.

Notable Leaders

Shyama Charan Tripura
Harinath Debbarma
Nagendra Jamatia
Drao Kumar Riang
Budha Debbarma
Gouri Sankar Reang
Rati Mohan Jamatia
Rabindra Debbarma
Diba Chandra Hrangkhowl

References

Defunct political parties in Tripura
Political parties established in 1967
Political parties disestablished in 2001
1967 establishments in Tripura